USS Empire State may refer to:

, was Procyon (AG-11), renamed for use as a training ship
, a training ship launched in 1961

United States Navy ship names